Entre la vida y la muerte (Between life and death) is a Mexican telenovela produced by Angelli Nesma Medina for Televisa in 1993.

Leticia Calderón and Fernando Ciangherotti starred as protagonists, while Sebastián Ligarde and Frances Ondiviela starred as antagonists.

Plot 
Susana Trejos, a responsible and dedicated doctor to their patients, is about to marry Andrés del Valle, a licensed with a dubious past. Susana is madly in love with Andrés, but he only wants to kill her to take over his entire fortune. Before the wedding, Susana receive a message which says that Andrés is very sick in the Lacandona Forest and about to die.

Cast 
 
Leticia Calderón as Susana Trejos
Fernando Ciangherotti as Archaeologist Andrés del Valle
Sebastián Ligarde as Lic. Andrés del Valle
Frances Ondiviela as Ivonne del Castillo
Irán Eory as Aída Trejos
Roberto Cañedo as Rolando Trejos
Beatriz Aguirre as Doña Rebeca
Raúl Ramírez as Julián
Mónika Sánchez as Angelica
Lupita Sandoval as Carlota
Maleni Morales as Constanza
Óscar Bonfiglio as Lic. García
Arsenio Campos as Francisco del Valle
Dacia Arcaráz as Arlette
Odiseo Bichir as Chon-Li
Lucero Lander as Paloma del Valle
Lorena Herrera as Jessica Rivas
Wendy de los Cobos as Sandra
María Cristina Ribal as Guadalupe del Valle
Irán Castillo as Anita del Valle
Alejandro Landero as Paco
Ramiro Huerta as Bor
Yadira Santana as Mayan/Cynthia
Felicia Mercado as Cristina
Andrea Cotto as Queta
Alejandro Ciangherotti as Abraham del Valle
Beatriz Martínez as Aurora del Valle
Isabel Andrade as Claudia del Valle
Alejandro Rábago as Melquiades
Germán Gutiérrez as Dante
Mario García González as Honorio
María Luisa Coronel as Najbor
Kokin as El Chino
Ismael Larrumbe as El Perico

Awards

References

External links

1993 telenovelas
Mexican telenovelas
1993 Mexican television series debuts
1993 Mexican television series endings
Spanish-language telenovelas
Television shows set in Mexico
Guatemala in fiction
Televisa telenovelas